Bharjari is a 2017 Indian Kannada-language masala film written and directed by Chethan Kumar. The film stars Dhruva Sarja, Rachita Ram and Haripriya. It also features Sudharani, Srinivasa Murthy and Sai Kumar in the supporting roles. The movie completed 100 days in one theater of its theatrical run and was blockbuster at the box office. It was dubbed in Tamil as Soorya the Soldier.

Plot
Surya, an orphan youth get a chance to join military. But he decide to help a girl and her family. In the process he will learn about his biological parents and his grandparents. How he will reconcile with his family  and the hurdles he faces forms the story.

Cast 
    
 Dhruva Sarja as Surya Rudraprathap
 Rachita Ram as Gowri
 Haripriya as Haasini
 Vaishali Deepak as Lakshmi
 Sudha Rani
 Tara
 Srinivasa Murthy
 Sai Kumar
 Bharath Gowda
 Avinash
 Raghav Uday
 Rangayana Raghu
 Anil Kumar
 Jai Jagadish
 Kuri Prathap
 Sadhu Kokila
 Raju Thalikote
 Suchendra Prasad
 Sangeetha
 Chiranjeevi Sarja as a soldier (Cameo appearance)
 Sumithra
 Jahangir M. S. 
 Raj Deepak Shetty 
 Arasu Maharaj 
 Madhugiri Prakash 
 Ashok Sharma 
 Narayana Swamy 
 Veena Ponnappa 
 Yamuna murthy 
 Malathi Shekhar 
 Shruthi raj
 Suresh Rai 
 Petrol Prasanna 
 Patre Nagaraj 
 Lakshman Rao

Production 
Bharjari was announced in April 2015 with Chethan Kumar directing it and writing its screenplay, and produced by R. Srinivas and Sreekanth K. P. under the production house RS Productions. Dhruva Sarja and was signed to play the male lead in the film. Sooraj S is signing to play antagonist role. Sarja had previously collaborated with the team in Bahaddur (2014). Rachita Ram's signing to play the female lead and supporting role by Tara Anuradha was confirmed in the same month. Sudharani also joined the cast to play an important supporting role.

The muhurat shot was taken on 12 June and filming began on 25 June 2015. Prior to it, in line with promoting the film, a first look teaser was released by the makers on YouTube in the form typography on 11 June. Calling it a 'look test', the director said it was a first in Kannada cinema.

Soundtrack

The original soundtrack for the film is composed by V. Harikrishna.

References

External links
 

2017 films
2010s Kannada-language films
2017 action comedy films
Films scored by V. Harikrishna
2017 masala films
Films shot in Slovenia
Films shot in Bangalore
Films directed by Chethan Kumar